Rachid El Ghazoui (born 27 January 1983), also known by his stage name Appa, is a Dutch rapper, whose roots lie in the mountainous regions of North-Morocco.

In 2002, he joined rap formation Tuindorp Hustler Click (THC), but decided to go solo. He is known for the political content of his lyrics and criticism of nationalist MP Geert Wilders. He also strongly identifies with the social problems of Moroccan youths. In November 2007, his first album called Straatfilosoof (Street Philosopher) appeared. In an interview he calls the album "autobiographical" and a "user guide for the people who don't understand us (Moroccan youths)".

Controversy
In 2015 El Ghazaoui attracted attention by denying the holocaust, by citing alleged quotes of the Talmud in order to raise hatred against Jews and by claiming that two mafia killers who, after murdering two fellow mafiosi, fired their kalashnikovs at the Dutch police, only received a life sentence because they are of Moroccan origin.

Discography
Albums
 Straatfilosoof (Street Philosopher) (2007)

Mixtapes
De Meest Onderschatte (The Most Underestimated) (2006)
TBS: Ter Beschikking van de Staat (At the Disposal of the State) (2007)

References

1983 births
Living people
Musicians from Amsterdam
Dutch people of Moroccan descent
Dutch rappers
Moroccan rappers
Holocaust deniers